The 2018–19 season was Deportivo Alavés's 107th season in existence and the club's 14th season in the top flight of Spanish football.

Players

Current squad

Out on loan

Transfers

In

 Total spending: €7,000,000

Out

 Total income: €0

Net income:  €7,000,000

Pre-season and friendlies

Competitions

Overview

La Liga

League table

Results summary

Results by round

Matches

Copa del Rey

Round of 32

Statistics

Appearances and goals
Last updated on 18 May 2019.

|-
! colspan=14 style=background:#dcdcdc; text-align:center|Goalkeepers

|-
! colspan=14 style=background:#dcdcdc; text-align:center|Defenders

|-
! colspan=14 style=background:#dcdcdc; text-align:center|Midfielders

|-
! colspan=14 style=background:#dcdcdc; text-align:center|Forwards

|-
! colspan=14 style=background:#dcdcdc; text-align:center| Players who have left the club during the season

|}

Cards
Accounts for all competitions. Last updated on 12 January 2019.

Clean sheets
Last updated on 12 January 2019.

References
Citations

External links

Deportivo Alavés seasons
Deportivo Alavés